The pertingent case is a grammatical case found in the Tlingit language. It is used to refer to something which is touching something else: for example, in English, "the chair touching the table", or "against the wall".

It is also found in the Archi language.

References 

Grammatical cases